Jesús Salinas Ortega, better known as his stage name Chucho Salinas (12 February 1928 – 8 November 2001) was a Mexican film and television actor and comedian. Credits in film include Nacidos para cantar (1965) and México 2000 (1983).

Salinas died in a traffic collision on 8 November 2001.

References

External links

Male actors from Mexico City
Comedians from Mexico City
Mexican male film actors
Mexican male television actors
20th-century Mexican male actors
Mexican male comedians
Road incident deaths in Mexico
1928 births
2001 deaths
20th-century comedians